Merlin Swartz (July 31, 1933–February 21, 2022) was an American scholar of religion.

Swartz attended Eastern Mennonite University (BA, 1955), Goshen College (BD, 1960), and Harvard University (PhD, 1967). He was Professor Emeritus of Religion (Islamic Studies) at Boston University, having taught previously at the American University in Beirut and Harvard Center for Middle Eastern Studies. His research and teaching focused primarily on the religious and intellectual history of medieval Islam.

Books

Ibn al-Jawzi, Kitab al-Qussas wa'l-Mudhakkirin (tr., intro.) (Institut de Lettres Orientales, Beirut 1971).
A Seventh-Century Sunni Creed: The 'Aqida Wasitiya of Ibn Taymiya (Mouton 1974).
Studies on Islam (Oxford 1981).
Humaniora Islamica, co-editor (Mouton 1973-1974).
A Medieval Critique of Anthropomorphism: Ibn al-Jawzi's Kitab Akhbar as-Sifat: A Critical Edition of the Arabic Text with Translation, Introduction and Notes (E.J. Brill, 2002).

References 
Boston University Profile
Obituary

1933 births
Academic staff of the American University of Beirut
Harvard University alumni
Harvard University faculty
Boston University faculty